The 2016–17 season was AFC Wimbledon's 15th season in the club's history and The Dons'  1st season in League One following their promotion via the 2016 Football League play-offs.

League table

Results summary

Matches

Pre-season friendlies

League One

August

September

October

November

December

January

February

March

April

FA Cup
On 17 October 2016, the draw for the FA Cup First round proper took place. The competition progresses in knock-out stages, culminating in a Final to be played at Wembley Stadium on 27 May 2017.

First round
At this stage, there were 80 clubs remaining in the competition (32 non-league teams progressing from the qualifying rounds and the 48 clubs from League One and League Two). AFC Wimbledon were drawn against fellow League One side Bury.

Second round
On 7 November 2016, the draw for the FA Cup Second round took place. At this stage, there were 40 clubs remaining in the competition (17 League One sides, 11 League Two sides and 12 non-league sides). AFC Wimbledon were drawn against National League North side Curzon Ashton.

Third round
On 5 December 2016, the draw for the FA Cup Third round took place. At this stage, there were 64 clubs remaining in the competition (20 Premier League sides, 24 Championship sides, 9 League One sides, 6 League Two sides and 5 non-league sides). AFC Wimbledon were drawn away against local National League side Sutton United.

Football League Cup
On 22 June 2016, the draw for the Football League Cup took place. The draw is seeded and regionalised on a north/south basis. Seedings are based on the league finishing positions for clubs in the previous season. The competition progresses in knock-out stages, culminating in a Final to be played at Wembley Stadium on 26 February 2017.

First round
The First Round of the competition includes 70 of the 72 Football League clubs: 24 from League Two, 24 from League One, and 22 from the Championship.

Football League Trophy
On 27 June 2016, the draw was made for the Group stages of the newly structured Football League Trophy. The first round will now consist of 64 clubs (24 from League One, 24 from League Two and 16 Category 1 Academy Teams) split into 16 groups of 4 teams, regionalised on a north/south basis, with each group including one Academy Team. Each club will play each other once, either home or away, with the top 2 teams from each group progressing to the knock-out stages, culminating in a Final to be played at Wembley Stadium on 2 April 2017.

First Round (Southern Group B)

Second Round (Southern Section)

The draw for the Second Round took place on 10 November 2016, with 32 clubs (13 from League One, 11 from League Two and 8 Category 1 Academy sides) progressing from the previous round, continuing to be regionalised on a north/south basis, with each group winner from the previous round being drawn at home to a second placed team from a different qualifying group.

Squad

Player statistics 

|-
|colspan="14"|Players who featured on loan for AFC Wimbledon but subsequently returned to their parent club:
|-
|colspan="14"|Players who left or were released by AFC Wimbledon during the course of the season:

|}

Top scorers

Disciplinary record

Transfers

References

AFC Wimbledon seasons
AFC Wimbledon